Levenhookia pulcherrima, the beautiful stylewort, is a dicotyledonous plant that belongs to the genus Levenhookia (family Stylidiaceae). Stems and older leaves are red. The sensitive labellum is obovate and white with a circular grey-purple mark on either side of the terminal portion. Both leaves and stems of L. pulcherrima possess more glandular trichomes than in other Levenhookia species. When describing this new species, Sherwin Carlquist noted that it is most closely related to L. preissii and L. pauciflora, which might place it with those species in section Levenhookia, but Carlquist neglected to specifically say so. He also noted that several features of this species, including its corolla lobe, labellum, throat appendage, and stigma morphology, are distinctly different from those species with which it appears to be associated. L. pulcherrima is endemic to southwestern Western Australia.

References

Endemic flora of Western Australia
Eudicots of Western Australia
pulcherrima
Plants described in 1969